The Idaho Observer was a monthly hardcopy 24-page constitutionally-oriented newspaper, founded in January 1997 in North Idaho, United States, but with a scope that covered all of America, delivered nationwide. The paper was a prominent example of advocacy journalism, focusing primarily on populist political issues, 9/11 truth, and the preservation of American civil liberties. The Observer also covered holistic medicine, along with national and international current affairs. In September 2009, Don Harkins, the editor of the newspaper, died. His widow, the director of Vaccination Liberation Ingri Cassel, announced in May 2010 that publication of The Idaho Observer would be discontinued. In August 2010, Mrs. Cassel signed the rights to The Idaho Observer over to David M. Estes. The effective date of the transfer was 1 September 2010. Since then, The Idaho Observer has been published as an Internet-based newspaper with the intention to return to print as the market dictates.

External links
 Original Idaho Observer website
 The Idaho Observer website

References

Newspapers published in Idaho
Newspapers established in 1997
1997 establishments in Idaho